The Estonia women's national basketball team represents Estonia in international women's basketball matches. They are controlled by the Estonian Basketball Association.

Team

Current roster
Roster for the EuroBasket Women 2019 qualification.

See also

Estonia national basketball team
Estonia women's national 3x3 team
Estonia women's national under-20 basketball team
Estonia women's national under-18 basketball team
Estonia women's national under-16 basketball team
Sport in Estonia

References

External links
Official website 
Estonian Basketball Association website 
Estonia National Team - Women at Eurobasket.com

Women's national basketball teams
national team
Basketball